The Albania men's national volleyball team is the national volleyball team of Albania. As of December 2021, the team is ranked 78th in the world. They have competed in many European and world volleyball championships, but as of October 16, 2021, are yet to win a gold medal.

Campaigns 

Albania competed in the Men's European Volleyball Championship three times, in 1955, 1958, and 1967. They also competed in the FIVB Volleyball Men's World Championship in 1962.

Albania competed seven times at the Mediterranean Games. They first participated in 1991 in Athens, Greece. Afterwards, they played at the Mediterranean Games in 1993, 1997, 2001, and again in 2018 in Tarragona, Spain.

Albania at the Men's European Volleyball Championships

1955 

Albania competed for the first time at the 1955 Men's European Volleyball Championship in Bucharest, Romania.

In Group A, they faced France, Finland, and the Soviet Union. Albania lost their first two matches against France and the Soviet Union (both 3–0) but recorded their first win at a Men's European Volleyball Championship against Finland 3–1. Albania finished third in the group of four countries.

In the 9–14th place group, Albania faced Egypt, Italy, Belgium, Austria, and Finland. After a 3–2 loss against Finland, the team beat their next three opponents: Egypt and Austria lost 3–0 to Albania, and Belgium lost 3–2. In the final match Albania lost to Italy. Albania finished in 10th place in the tournament.

1958 

Albania competed for the second time in the 1958 Men's European Volleyball Championship in Prague, Czechoslovakia.

In Group D, Albania faced the Soviet Union, Austria, Turkey, and Yugoslavia. Albania first beat Austria 3–0, but lost their next four matches against Turkey, the Soviet Union, and Yugoslavia, all with a score of 3–0. Albania ranked fourth out of five in the group.

Albania then faced East Germany, Turkey, Italy, Finland, Tunisia, Egypt, and the Netherlands in the 9–16th place group. Albania was successful in beating Tunisia and Turkey 3–1, Egypt 3–0, and Finland 3–1. Albania then faced East Germany, losing 3–0. They went on to beat the Netherlands 3–2 in a close match for their sixth win of the tournament. In their final match for 10th place, Albania lost to Italy by a score of 3–0, finishing in 11th place at the end of the tournament.

1967 

The Albania men's national volleyball team participated once more at the 1967 Men's European Volleyball Championship in Istanbul, Turkey.

In Group D, Albania faced Poland, West Germany, Bulgaria, and Romania. Albania lost to Romania 3–0, to Bulgaria 3–1, and to Poland 3–0. They later beat West Germany 3–0, again qualifying for the 9–16th place group.

In this group, Albania faced France, Belgium, Sweden, Israel, Turkey, Bulgaria, and the Netherlands. Albania lost to France 3–1 and to Belgium 3–0. After that, they won 3 matches in a row against hosts Turkey 3–1, Sweden 3–0, and the Netherlands 3–2. To close out the tournament, Albania lost to Israel 3–0 and ended in 13th place.

Team

Current roster
''Updated: 17 October 2016

The following is a list of players that represented Albania at the 2016 CEV Volleyball European League.

References

External links
 Official website 

National sports teams of Albania
National men's volleyball teams
Volleyball in Albania